"Free Fallin" is the opening track from American musician Tom Petty's debut solo album, Full Moon Fever (1989). The song was written by Petty and his writing partner for the album, Jeff Lynne, and features Lynne on backing vocals and bass guitar. The duo wrote and recorded the single in two days, making it the first song completed for Full Moon Fever.

"Free Fallin'" is one of Petty's most famous tracks as well as his highest - and longest - charting song. It peaked at No. 7 on the Billboard Hot 100 singles chart in January 1990, becoming his third and final top ten hit. Petty and The Heartbreakers performed the song at the MTV Video Music Awards in 1989, with Axl Rose and Izzy Stradlin, and at the February 2008 Super Bowl XLII Halftime Show. The song is ranked No. 219 on Rolling Stones 500 Greatest Songs of All Time. It was featured in the film Jerry Maguire (1996) and The Sopranos episode 2.13, "Funhouse" (2000). Lou Reed selected the song as one of his "picks of 1989". The song reached No. 2 on the Spotify Global Viral 50 following Petty's death in 2017.

Development and meaning
Petty explained in an interview with Billboard magazine that he and Jeff Lynne were sitting around trying to come up with a song, and Lynne got him to say "free falling". The next day they recorded the song. Petty did not write the song about a specific person, but instead about what he saw during his frequent drives along Ventura Boulevard.

Reception
"Free Fallin'" is widely regarded as one of Petty's best songs. Billboard and Rolling Stone both ranked the song number four on their lists of the greatest Tom Petty songs, while WatchMojo considers it to be Tom Petty's best song.

Personnel
 Tom Petty – lead & backing vocals, 12-string acoustic guitar
 Mike Campbell – 12-string electric guitar
 Jeff Lynne – acoustic guitar, bass, synthesizer, backing vocals
 Phil Jones – drums and tambourine

Music video
The music video was for the song was directed by Piers Garland and Julien Temple and features a teenage girl seen in various places around Los Angeles, including a 1960s pool party and a 1980s skate park. Petty is also seen performing in these places and others, such as the former Westside Pavilion mall.

Track listings

Charts

Weekly charts

Year-end charts

Certifications

Release history

Cover versions
 In 1993, De La Soul and Teenage Fanclub sampled the song for "Fallin'", which appeared on the Judgment Night soundtrack.
 In 2007, John Mayer played an acoustic cover of the song in a performance at the Nokia Theater in Los Angeles, as a part of his 2008 live album Where the Light Is. The single was certified double platinum in Australia in 2021 and Gold in the UK by the British Phonographic Industry (BPI) in 2022.
 In 2017, Coldplay covered the song with Peter Buck of R.E.M. in Portland, Oregon as a tribute to Petty following his death. Coldplay performed the song again in Pasadena, California with James Corden.

References

External links
 SongFacts information page on "Free Fallin'"
 

1989 singles
Tom Petty songs
Songs about California
Songs about Los Angeles
Songs written by Jeff Lynne
Song recordings produced by Jeff Lynne
Songs written by Tom Petty
1989 songs
MCA Records singles
Rock ballads
Folk ballads
Music videos directed by Julien Temple
1980s ballads
American folk rock songs